Embree is a small community just outside Lewisporte. It is a drive-through town that eventually leads into neighbouring Little Burnt Bay.

The hulk of British corvette HMS Calypso (1883), abandoned in 1968, is visible just south of Embree.

Demographics 

References

Populated coastal places in Canada
Towns in Newfoundland and Labrador